Little Chief is a 1926 boat plying Saint Mary Lake, renamed from Rising Wolf  in 1990 after a major restoration. Its stem and keel are made of fir and it has a steel stem band.

It is USCG-rated to carry 49 passengers and two crew members, and is registered at 13 gross tons and 10 net
tons.

It was listed on the National Register of Historic Places in 2016 as "Rising Wolf".

The "Little Chief" name is a reference to Little Chief Mountain.

References

National Register of Historic Places in Glacier County, Montana
Boats
1926 ships
National Register of Historic Places in Glacier National Park
Water transportation on the National Register of Historic Places
1926 establishments in Montana